Austin Madison (born 1984) is an American animator, artist, story artist, and voice actor who works at Pixar Animation Studios.

Early life 
After graduating from Sheldon High School in 2002, he attended the character animation program at the California Institute of the Arts; he graduated from there in 2006.

Career 
Ever since his 2006 graduation, Madison has worked as an animator and story artist for Pixar. He has also served as a voice actor on short films, and as a voice actor in Mondo Media's Dick Figures.

Madison has done animation work for many very popular and successful Pixar films. The most well-known titles that he has been involved with are: Incredibles 2 (2018), Toy Story 3 (2010), Up (2009), WALL-E (2008), and Ratatouille (2007).

The most influential role he has had in his animation career was as the lead animator for the 2012 film Brave, which would go on to be the 13th-highest grossing film for that year. That film also won the Academy Award for Best Animated Feature at the 85th Academy Awards, and the Golden Globe Award for Best Animated Feature Film at the 70th Golden Globe Awards.

Madison created cartoon battle sketches that depicted real and current NFL football matchups extensively during the 2012 and 2013 seasons, and for a few games during the 2014 season. He did cartoon battle sketches for some playoff games in those three seasons also, including Super Bowl XLVII between the Baltimore Ravens and San Francisco 49ers, and Super Bowl XLVIII between the Denver Broncos and Seattle Seahawks.

Additionally, Madison serves as an instructor for The Animation Collaborative, an Emeryville, California premiere training workshop for animation and animation art serving the San Francisco Bay Area.

Filmography

Film

Television

References 

1984 births
Living people
21st-century American male actors
American animators
American male voice actors
California Institute of the Arts alumni
Pixar people